Buechenegg Pass (el. ) is a mountain pass in the Albis range in the canton of Zurich in Switzerland. It connects Langnau am Albis and Tägerst, on the road from Aeugst am Albis to Stallikon. The western ramp and crest of the pass is in the municipality of Stallikon, with the eastern ramp in Langnau. A walking trail follows the ridge-line of the Albis range and connects Buechenegg with Felsenegg and Uetliberg, to the north, and the Albis Pass to the south.

References

Mountain passes of Switzerland
Mountain passes of the canton of Zürich